Kiltan or Kilthān Island is a coral island belonging to the Amindivi Subgroup of islands of the Union Territory of Lakshadweep in India.
The nearest mainland body is Cannanore and the nearest port is Mangalore.

History
Kiltan is settled during early periods of common immigration to the Lakshadweep islands. The island was part of an international trade route between the Persian Gulf and Ceylon.

Kiltan is the home of the Sufi saint Shaikh Ahmed Naqshabanthi .

Geography
Kiltan is one of the populated islands of Lakshadweep. It is located 51 km to the northeast of Amini Island and 32 km to the southeast of Chetlat Island, between 11° 28′ and 11° 30′ N latitude and 72° 59′ and 73° 01′ E longitude, and has an area of 2.20 km2.. The reef and lagoon (total area of ) are located to the west of the island and the dry land has 3.4 km length and 0.6 km width at the broadest point.
. On the northern and southern ends of the island, there are high storm beaches. This island is 291 km away from Kannur, 303 km away from Kozhikode, and 394 km (213 nautical miles) away from Kochi. Its lagoon area is 1.76 km2.

Kiltan island also has crossed by 73rd meridian east through its landmark known as Kulikkara is a tomb of a Lady venerated by natives.

Economics
Traditionally the basic earning method was fishing and coconut production. Now the island people have moved to several directions, including Government jobs (education, police, communication, transportation, business and IT ). also private job opportunities such as construction (buildings, road), plumbing, electrifying etc.

Demographics
The population in Kiltan was 3945 as per census 2011. Most people from Kiltan, as in Amini and Kadmat, belonged to the Koya, Mali and Melacheri families. 
The language spoken is Jeseri, a mixture of Malayalam and Tamil influenced by Arabic as in other islands. But the peoples don't use its script because its writing was stopped too earlier period. Kiltan has rich folk cultures and warm hospitality to its tradition.
The Island has a 41-metre lighthouse and an average Heliport t used by Administration for Emergency medical services.

In the past, Kiltan was nicknamed as Cheriyaponnani meaning Little Ponnani because of the Islanders acquired knowledge from here during the pre-colonial periods in relative that the Ponnani was known for centre of Islamic Religious knowledge in Southern India.

Administration
The island has a Sub Divisional Officer appointing by administration from Kavaratti the Union capital of Lakshadweep commanding as executive and judicial head of islands. The Police station of Kiltan have dozens of constables and marines under a sub-inspector. Also there have a base camp for IRBN (India Reserve Bettalion) for duties such as safeguarding of Treasury and use as additional force with police in case of an emergency.

Image gallery

References

External links

Lagoon sizes
Kiltan - Geographical information

List of Atolls
An ornithological expedition to the Lakshadweep archipelago
Sources towards a history of the Laccadive Islands
FAO - An analysis of the carrying Capacity of Lakshadweep Coral Reefs

Islands of Lakshadweep
Atolls of India
Cities and towns in Lakshadweep district
Islands of India
Populated places in India